"Three Words" is the sixteenth episode of the eighth season (and the 177th episode overall) of the science fiction television series The X-Files. It first aired in the United States and Canada on April 8, 2001, on Fox. Written by executive producers Chris Carter and Frank Spotnitz, and directed by Tony Wharmby, it explores the series' overarching mythology. It earned a Nielsen rating of 7.6, viewed by 7.77 million households, and received mixed to positive reviews from television critics.

The episode centers on FBI special agents Fox Mulder (David Duchovny), Dana Scully (Gillian Anderson) and John Doggett (Robert Patrick), who work on cases linked to the paranormal, called X-Files. When a man is gunned down on the White House lawn attempting to inform the president of a pending alien invasion, Mulder secretly conducts his own investigation, but is soon in over his head as he tries to expose further evidence of colonization.

The episode was written to signal Mulder's exit from the FBI. The producers and writers felt that, if Mulder's character was given a clean exit, the show could more easily focus on the characters of John Doggett and Monica Reyes in the following season. Former series star and recurring actor David Duchovny later declared he had been happy to see his character depart in this way.

Plot
Under cover of darkness, an unidentified man jumps over the fence to the White House and is intercepted by Secret Service personnel. As he struggles with them, he pulls a gun and accidentally shoots himself. Bleeding on the ground, he hands over a computer disk, begging them to give it to the President. Three words are written on the disk: FIGHT THE FUTURE.

While still at the hospital, Fox Mulder (David Duchovny) recalls how he was tortured on the alien ship. Dana Scully (Gillian Anderson) enters with Dr. Lim and they give him surprisingly good news: the neurological condition that was killing him, before his disappearance, has disappeared and he is in perfect health. Mulder returns to his apartment with Scully and he congratulates her on the pregnancy she had sought for a long time. Meanwhile, in prison, an inmate librarian gives former UFO cult leader Absalom a book about the apocalypse. Hidden inside it is a newspaper article about the man who jumped the fence. Absalom later escapes during a work detail by attacking a guard.

At FBI Headquarters, Deputy Director Alvin Kersh informs John Doggett (Robert Patrick) and Walter Skinner (Mitch Pileggi) that Mulder has applied for reinstatement to the X-Files. He intends to deny the request, claiming a higher percentage of success with Doggett. Kersh ignores Doggett and Skinner's defenses of Mulder, perceiving him to be a crusader unfit for proper Bureau work. Doggett later finds Absalom waiting for him at home with a gun, demanding that Doggett show the back of his neck to confirm his identity. He tells Doggett that the man killed at the White House, Howard Salt, died for what he knew about an alien invasion.

Absalom duct tapes his gun to Doggett's back in a plan to get Salt's information, with Doggett used as a hostage. The two attempt to sneak into the census bureau's database, which Absalom claims contains data showing the aliens are already here. Unfortunately, the plan fails when an X-ray scanner detects the gun. Absalom is shot and killed by security. Mulder later accuses Doggett of deliberately attempting to cover up the truth by setting up Absalom to be killed, to which Doggett takes great offense. Doggett later meets with his liaison, Knowle Rohrer, who reveals the password to the census bureau is "Fight the Future."

Through Scully, Doggett gives the password to Mulder. Mulder breaks into the census bureau with the help of the Lone Gunmen, searching computer data. Doggett soon arrives, realizing that the password leak was a trap. After a bitter argument  and upon both Scully and the Gunmen revealing to Mulder the arrival of black ops mercenaries on the scene  they are forced to leave. Doggett confronts Rohrer about the false tip, but Rohrer claims he was just trying to help Doggett learn the truth. As Doggett and Skinner leave, strange protrusions are seen at the back of Rohrer's neck.

Production 
"Three Words" was written by executive producers Chris Carter and Frank Spotnitz, directed by Tony Wharmby and saw Nelson Mashita reprise his role of Doctor Lim, having appeared in the previous episode "Deadalive". Judson Scott also made his third appearance in the series as cult leader Absalom, reprising the role from both "Deadalive" and "This Is Not Happening". The baseball field scene was filmed at Cheviot Hills Park, in Los Angeles; the park had previously been used in the sixth season episode "The Unnatural" and would be later re-used in the ninth season episode "Lord of the Flies".

In the episode, Mulder prepares to submit his application to be reassigned to X-Files division. Meanwhile, Mulder's boss, Deputy Director Kersh, informs Doggett that he intends to deny the request. As season eight was nearly over, the producers and writers decided to refuse Mulder re-admittance into the FBI as a way to segue John Doggett and Monica Reyes into the series as the new main stars of season nine. David Duchovny agreed with this method, noting, "I completely thought it was correct that they should be trying to focus elsewhere, and that, since I was going to come back for the second half of season eight, if you were to refocus on whatever Mulder's up to, you'd be in the same lousy situation at the beginning of season nine."

Broadcast and reception 
"Three Words" was viewed by 7.77 million households and ranked as the 32nd most-watched episode for the week ending April 8. Fox promoted the episode with the tagline "Who will control the X-Files?" The episode was later included on The X-Files Mythology, Volume 4 – Super Soldiers, a DVD collection that contains episodes involved with the alien super soldiers arc.

"Three Words" received mixed to positive reviews from critics. Robert Shearman and Lars Pearson, in their book Wanting to Believe: A Critical Guide to The X-Files, Millennium & The Lone Gunmen, rated the episode five stars out of five, calling it "extremely well-performed by all concerned." Shearman and Pearson felt that the episode was similar to the earlier "Per Manum" and was somewhat formulaic; however, they noted that this was a necessary and positive step towards redefining the series after the changes made in its last two seasons explaining "the point of all this is only to emphasise how different The X-Files universe now feels, the familiarity of the ingredients only making us more aware that the mix is never going to be the same again". Writing for Television Without Pity, Jessica Morgan rated the episode a "B", although she felt that by this stage the series' mythology was moving "in concentric circles of pain and confusion".

Zack Handlen of The A.V. Club awarded the episode a "B+" and wrote that the episode, "finds Duchovny back on his feet and ready for action, and he brings a new energy to the part." He enjoyed the way the show presented the story as one wherein, "we spend as much time watching Mulder from the outside as we do seeing events from his perspective," because it "makes things interesting." Handlen also wrote that while the episode did not hit the emotional notes that its predecessor, "Deadalive", did, it was nonetheless "stronger plotwise" and built to an "inevitable conclusion in classic X-Files style".

Not all reviews were positive; Tom Kessenich, in his book Examinations, gave the episode a mixed review, writing, "This was an episode that had tremendous promise and Carter and Spotnitz almost got it right. Sadly, they failed to invest themselves fully and intelligently into Mulder's return." Paula Vitaris from Cinefantastique gave the episode a largely negative review and awarded it one-and-a-half stars out of four. Vitaris wrote that, despite opening "with tremendously affecting acting from [David] Duchovny", the episode lapses into "a lost opportunity to explore the psyche of a person who has suffered torture".

Notes

Footnotes

Bibliography

External links 

 

2001 American television episodes
Television episodes written by Chris Carter
The X-Files (season 8) episodes
Television episodes set in Virginia
Television episodes set in West Virginia